Scuol is a municipality in the Engiadina Bassa/Val Müstair Region in the Swiss canton of Grisons.  The official language in Scuol is Romansh.  On 1 January 2015 the former municipalities of Ardez, Guarda, Tarasp, Ftan and Sent merged into Scuol.

Name
The official name has undergone several changes in the 20th century:
 Until 1943, the official name of the municipality was Schuls.
 In 1943, it was changed to Bad Scuol/Schuls.
 In 1970 Schuls was dropped as an official name, leaving only Bad Scuol.
 In 1999 Bad was dropped, leaving today's name, Scuol.

History

Scuol is first mentioned in 1095 as Schulles.

The Neo-Renaissance style Grand Hotel Waldhaus Vulpera in Scuol-Tarasp with Sgraffito-Elements was opened on 8 June 1897 and was one of the first addresses in the Swiss Alps and was a major Belle Époque monument in Europe.

Geography

Of this area, about 26.9% is used for agricultural purposes, while 25.8% is forested. Of the rest of the land, 1.2% is settled (buildings or roads) and 46.1% is unproductive land.

The resort has 80 kilometers of slopes and 12 lifts (aerial cableway/ chair lifts / drag lifts).

Before 2017 it was the municipality is the capital of the Inn district and was located in the Suot Tasna sub-district, after 2017 it was part of the Engiadina Bassa/Val Müstair Region.  It is a well known spa town and vacation spot and is the business center of the Unterengadin valley.  It is the largest village on the left side of the Inn river.  It consists of the village of Scuol with the section Pradella and the old mining village of S-charl.  Until 1970 Scuol was known as Scuol/Schuls.

The God da Tamangur ("the forest back there") is the highest continuous stone pine (pinus cembra) forest in Europe, right at the furthest end of the Val S-charl, south of Scuol. Due to the altitude and weather, the trees grow very slowly and may live up to 700 years.

Demographics

, 23.6% of the population was made up of foreign nationals. Over the last 10 years the population has grown at a rate of 1.4%.

, the gender distribution of the population was 48.5% male and 51.5% female.  The age distribution, in Scuol is; 220 children or 10.4% of the population are between 0 and 9 years old.  106 teenagers or 5.0% are 10 to 14, and 139 teenagers or 6.6% are 15 to 19.  Of the adult population, 248 people or 11.7% of the population are between 20 and 29 years old.  334 people or 15.7% are 30 to 39, 306 people or 14.4% are 40 to 49, and 278 people or 13.1% are 50 to 59.  The senior population distribution is 201 people or 9.5% of the population are between 60 and 69 years old, 154 people or 7.3% are 70 to 79, there are 115 people or 5.4% who are 80 to 89, and there are 21 people or 1.0% who are 90 to 99.

In 2013 there were 1,073 private households in Scuol.  Of the 694 inhabited buildings in the municipality, in 2000, about 41.6% were single family homes and 36.6% were multiple family buildings.  Additionally, about 36.5% of the buildings were built before 1919, while 11.4% were built between 1991 and 2000.  In 2012 the rate of construction of new housing units per 1000 residents was 20.57.  The vacancy rate for the municipality, was 2.48%.

Historic Population
The historical population is given in the following chart:

Languages
Half of the population speaks Romansh (49.4%), with German  being second most common (39.2%) and Italian being third ( 3.9%).  Scuol is host to a branch of the Lia Rumantscha.

Economy
, there were a total of 2,240 people employed in the municipality.  Of these, a total of 39 people worked in 13 businesses in the primary economic sector.  The secondary sector employed 394 workers in 33 separate businesses.  Finally, the tertiary sector provided 1,807 jobs in 265 businesses.  In 2013 a total of 20.6% of the population received social assistance.

Politics
In the 2011 federal election the most popular party was the BDP with 43.2% of the vote.  The next three most popular parties were the SVP (20.1%), the SP (15.1%) and the FDP (10.3%).  In the federal election, a total of 666 votes were cast, and the voter turnout was 46.0%.

Crime
In 2014 the crime rate, of the over 200 crimes listed in the Swiss Criminal Code (running from murder, robbery and assault to accepting bribes and election fraud), in Scuol was 41.3 per thousand residents.  This rate is only 63.9% of the average rate in the entire country.  During the same period, the rate of drug crimes was 8.5 per thousand residents and the rate of violations of immigration, visa and work permit laws was 0.9 per thousand.

Education
In Scuol about 69.7% of the population (between age 25–64) have completed either non-mandatory upper secondary education or additional higher education (either university or a Fachhochschule).

Transportation

Hospital
There is one small regional hospital, called Ospidal Engiadina Bassa (Romansh: Hospital of the Lower Engadin). The hospital celebrated its 100th anniversary on 21 June 2008. It is one of the country's smallest hospitals, offering basic services such as departments of surgery, internal medicine, cardiology, dermatology, oncology, gynecology, a 24-hour Emergency Department, and a 2-bed intensive care unit. Understandably for a mountain resort with a major ski region, orthopedic procedures are very common.

Heritage sites of national significance

The Baselgia refurmada, the Chasa Wieland Nr. 29 and the Kurhaus Bad Tarasp (spa Bad Tarasp) in Scuol, the Chasté (a prehistoric site, a medieval fortress and a church) and the Doppelwohnhaus (Double-house) in Ardez, Tarasp Castle and the Trinkhalle (drinking hall) in Tarasp are all listed as Swiss heritage sites of national significance.

The Chastè site includes settlements from the late Bronze Age (Melauner culture) into the early Iron Age (Fritzens-Sanzeno culture) as well as some finds from the Roman Empire.

The Chasa Wieland Nr.29 in Scuol village was built around a three story medieval stone tower. It was likely built by one of a few Graubünden noble families. The tower may have been damaged when Scuol was destroyed in 1499 during the Swabian War, but if so it was quickly repaired. During the Bündner Wirren, in 1622, Scuol and the tower were burned. Some of the doorways are from the tower, while new windows had to be broken into the walls. The date 1753 was carved into the lintel. The walls still show the Pietra Rasa construction, where the mortar that holds the rough stones together is also used as a plaster to them. After plastering with mortar, lines are incised into the mortar to give the appearance of regular bricks or stones.

Climate
Due to its geographical positioning, being located in the depth of a valley, Scuol features a warm-summer humid continental climate (Köppen: "Dfb") with moderate summers and chilly winters, which is usually accompanied with occasional snowfall. Despite seeing an average low of −8º in its coldest month, the winters here are not as cold as the towns upstream (such as St. Moritz). 
The town sees an average of 94.5 days of rain per year and on average receives  of precipitation. During this month there is precipitation for an average of 11.8 days.

Notable people 
 Felix Calonder, Swiss politician
 Tonia Maria Zindel, Swiss actress

References

External links

 Scuol municipality website (in Romansh and German)

 
Municipalities of Graubünden
Ski areas and resorts in Switzerland
Spa towns in Switzerland
Cultural property of national significance in Graubünden
Populated places on the Inn (river)